Think Tank Row designates the cluster of think tanks that are located on or around Massachusetts Avenue NW in Washington, D.C., between Thomas Circle and Dupont Circle. The expression is a reference to Millionaire Row and Embassy Row, past and present designations for the same area (both actually extending further northwest on Massachusetts Avenue). 

Policy pundit James McGann has been credited for coining the expression "Think Tank Row," which has been used in various media articles referring to think tanks.

Think tanks on Think Tank Row include: 
 the Carnegie Endowment for International Peace, on 1779 Massachusetts Avenue NW since 1989; 
 the Brookings Institution, on 1775 Massachusetts Avenue NW since 1960 (and 1780 Massachusetts Avenue NW since 2008); 
 the Peterson Institute for International Economics, on 1750 Massachusetts Avenue NW since 2001; 
 the American Enterprise Institute, on 1785 Massachusetts Avenue NW since 2016. 
 the Center for Strategic and International Studies, on 1616 Rhode Island Avenue NW since 2013; 

Also on Think Tank Row are several academic institutions that occasionally interact with think tanks: 
 the Paul H. Nitze School of Advanced International Studies of Johns Hopkins University, on 1717 and 1740 Massachusetts Avenue NW since 1962; 
 the Carey Business School of Johns Hopkins University, on 1625 Massachusetts Avenue NW; 
 the Washington Center of the University of California, on 1608 Rhode Island Avenue NW. 

Other nearby think tanks include the Aspen Institute, the Atlantic Council, the Middle East Institute, the Milken Institute, the German Marshall Fund, the Center for International Policy, Resources for the Future, and the New America Foundation. The Cato Institute and The Heritage Foundation are also located on Massachusetts Avenue, but at some distance from Think Tank Row.

Gallery

See also
 Embassy Row

References 

Think tanks based in Washington, D.C.
Dupont Circle